The inauguration of Millard Fillmore as the 13th president of the United States, was held on Wednesday, July 10, 1850, at the House chamber inside the United States Capitol in Washington, D.C., following the death of President Zachary Taylor the previous day. This inauguration – the second non-scheduled, extraordinary inauguration to ever take place – marked the commencement of Millard Fillmore’s only term (a partial term of ) as president.

During the inauguration, William Cranch, Chief Judge of the U.S. Circuit Court of the D.C., administered the presidential oath of office to Fillmore. Cranch had also administered the oath to John Tyler in 1841, when Tyler succeeded to the presidency upon William Henry Harrison's death. Fillmore was the last president from neither the Democratic or Republican parties.

See also
Presidency of Millard Fillmore

References

External links
More documents from the Library of Congress

United States presidential inaugurations
1850 in American politics
Inauguration
1850 in Washington, D.C.
July 1850 events